Good Southern Girl is the fourth album from New Orleans singer and fiddler Amanda Shaw. It is Amanda's first release with her new label, Poorman Mayfield Music, which is co-founded by New Orleans Jazz great Irvin Mayfield.

Track listing 
 "Good Southern Girl" (4:05)
 "Mississippi Kid" (4:03)
 "Cruise" (2:58)
 "Intro Segment: Perridon Two-Step" (:13)
 "Johnny Can't Dance" (4:01)
 "Sweet Honey" (3:49)
 "That's It I Quit" (3:40)
 "One Night Stand" (3:19)
 "Meek Maid's Reel" (3:29)
 "What Time You Comin' Home" (2:04)
 "Creole Reel" (:21)
 "Git Fiddler" (3:25)
 "Blues de La Frontier BONUS: Yes Yes Girl" (6:43)

References

2010 albums
Amanda Shaw albums